Euphoria (Original Score from the HBO Series) is a soundtrack by British musician Labrinth, containing the score for the first season of the HBO teen drama Euphoria. It was released digitally by Sony Masterworks and Milan Records on 4 October 2019, with vinyl copies following on 10 January 2020. It is Labrinth's first full-length solo release since 2012's Electronic Earth. The album peaked at number 79 on the Billboard 200, the artist's first entry on the chart, and entered the top 50 in several countries including Australia, Austria, Belgium, Canada, Denmark, Ireland, the Netherlands, New Zealand, Norway, and Sweden.

Album track "Still Don't Know My Name" became a sleeper hit in 2020, eventually peaking at number 52 in Labrinth's native UK and becoming certified Platinum in the United States, his first solo certification in the country. "Formula", "Forever", "When I R.I.P.", and "Mount Everest", also charted in various countries, with the later song also appearing on Imagination & the Misfit Kid and his second Euphoria score album.

Background and composition
Of his approach to composing the score, Labrinth said "It was a dream come true to give wings and add magic to the different storylines. It was a collaborative effort among Sam Levinson, the crew and the cast – I only added texture to an already phenomenal show. I hope that anyone who listens to the music embraces feeling something." Labrinth initially did not want to use his own voice for the project, but Levinson persuaded him to after hearing his original demos. The placement of Labrinth's voice throughout the underscore of the series allows him to "become an unseen ethereal thread connecting all of the central figures in Euphoria."

The score is described as "genre blending" and fuses gospel, electronica, orchestral music, and melodic house with elements of soul, R&B, smooth jazz, jungle, and hip hop.

Track listing

Charts

Weekly charts

Year-end charts

Certifications

Release history

References

2019 soundtrack albums
Labrinth albums
Television soundtracks
Milan Records soundtracks
Sony Music soundtracks
Soundtracks by British artists
Electronica albums by British artists
Gospel albums by British artists
House music albums by British artists
Electronic soundtracks
Albums produced by Labrinth
Euphoria (TV series)